The Daytona 200 is an annual motorcycle road racing competition held in early spring at the Daytona International Speedway in Daytona Beach, Florida. The  race was founded in 1937 when it was sanctioned by the American Motorcyclist Association (AMA). The original course used the beach itself before moving to a paved closed circuit in 1961. The Daytona 200 reached its zenith of worldwide popularity in the 1970s when the race attracted the largest crowds of any AMA race along with some of the top rated international motorcycle racers.

History

Dirt track origins
The origins of the Daytona 200 began in 1932 when the Southeastern Motorcycle Dealers Association organized a 200-mile dirt track race held on the old Vanderbilt Cup course in Savannah, Georgia. Competitors raced on Class C motorcycles typically used in the AMA Grand National Championship. Following a second Savannah race held in 1933, the 1934 event was moved to the Camp Foster Work Camp located on the St. Johns River near Jacksonville, Florida. The competition quickly outgrew the narrow, Jacksonville course and after the 1935 race, the event returned to Savannah in 1936.

Beach racing
Daytona Beach had been used by land speed record competitors since 1902 however, by 1935 the rutted beach course began losing its appeal in favor of the Bonneville Salt Flats. In an effort to boost the local economy, race promoter Bill France Sr. arranged for the Savannah 200 to be moved to the  Daytona Beach Road Course in 1937. There were no races held between 1942 and 1946 due to wartime restrictions during the Second World War. In 1948, a new beach course was used because of urban developments along the beach forced the race organizers to move the event further south, towards Ponce Inlet. By the mid-1950s, it became increasingly complicated to run the race on the beach course due to the rapid urban growth of the Daytona Beach area.

Move to the Daytona International Speedway
France looked for alternatives and negotiated with the city of Daytona Beach to purchase a site near the Daytona airport. He arranged financing and in 1957, construction began on the Daytona International Speedway, a  paved, oval-shaped circuit with steep bankings that permitted higher speeds. The track opened in 1959 and France convinced AMA officials to move the beach race to the Speedway in 1961. Competitors adapted to the new, paved track surface by switching from dirt track motorcycles to road racing motorcycles similar to those used in Grand Prix motorcycle racing. Safety concerns kept motorcycle racers from using the daunting 31 degree banking at the Daytona International Speedway for the first three years so, a race course was created using most of the track infield along with the tri-oval section where the finish line is located in front of the spectator stands.

International prominence
Initially, the traditionalists who favored the old beach race stayed away from the new race at the Speedway and attendance in the early years suffered. However, France continued to promote the race and by the early 1970s, the Daytona 200 attracted the largest crowds of any AMA race and the event took on international prominence. The race became the centerpiece of what became known as Daytona Beach Bike Week, featuring motorcycle competitions besides road racing such as motocross and dirt track racing. Attending the annual event became known as a rite of spring for thousands of motorcyclists seeking to escape the colder northern climes. At the peak of the event's popularity in the early 1970s, chartered airliners were used to bring race fans from Europe to Daytona Beach.

In 1969 Yvon Duhamel riding a Yamaha TD3 became the first rider to qualify for the event with a lap speed above 150 mph. Duhamel’s pole position on the tiny 350cc Yamaha motorcycle against the larger 750cc four-strokes marked the beginning of the two-stroke era in AMA road racing competitions. Don Emde became the first competitor to win the Daytona 200 on a two stroke motorcycle when he won the 1972 event riding a Yamaha TR3. His victory marked the beginning of thirteen consecutive Yamaha victories at the Daytona 200 including nine consecutive victories by the dominant Yamaha TZ750. Emde's 1972 victory marked the first father and son winners of the Daytona 200 as his father, Floyd Emde won the 1948 Daytona 200 beach race on an Indian.

When the popularity of motocross surged in the United States in the late 1960s, France added a professional motocross race to the 1971 Daytona Beach Bike Week schedule. The 1972 race was held at Daytona International Speedway on an artificial track on the grass surface between the main grandstand and the pit lane. The event paved the way for artificial, stadium-based motocross events known as supercross to be held in major league sports stadiums across the United States and Canada.

In 1973, the reigning 250cc world champion, Jarno Saarinen, became the first European rider to win the Daytona 200. The 1974 victory by 15-time world champion Giacomo Agostini helped cement the Daytona 200's reputation as one of the world's most prestigious motorcycle races. In 1975, an unknown rookie rider named Johnny Cecotto accomplished one of the most impressive performances in the history of the event when, he rode from last place on the starting grid to finish the race in third place, passing half the field of competitors on the first lap alone. The success of the Daytona 200 spawned imitations in Europe such as the Imola 200 and the Paul Ricard 200.

Safety issues and diminished status
As motorcycle engine technology transitioned from the 60 horsepower four-stroke motorcycles of the 1960s, to the 100 horsepower two-stroke motorcycles of the 1970s, it became apparent that motorcycle tire technology was lagging behind engine performance on the track's banking. In an effort to slow the fastest bikes down and save on tire wear, a chicane was added in 1973 at the end of the Daytona back straight. The dangers that motorcycle racers were exposed to was highlighted in 1975 when a documentary crew were filming as Barry Sheene crashed on the banked track at over 170 mph when his rear tire failed. As speeds continued to increase, organizers eventually moved away from high powered Grand Prix-style motorcycles to highly modified production motorcycles known as Superbikes in 1985, which led to a global trend of Superbike racing that by 1988 would lead to the development of an FIM-sanctioned Superbike World Championship in 1988. The loss of Grand Prix machinery meant that fewer international competitors were interested in entering the race and, began a slow decline in the event's prestige.

By the late 1990s, even the production based Superbikes were overheating the tires on the banking. To keep Superbikes in the Daytona 200, the West Banking was eliminated to reduce the tire issues that had been plaguing the motorcycles. However, the owners of Daytona International Speedway were unsatisfied with the banking being omitted from the course so, a compromise was reached after the 2004 season reducing the size and power of the bikes by going to a Supersport-based class (known as "AMA Formula Xtreme"), and putting both bankings back into the race course. The Supersport class race kept the  distance, but the Superbike race was converted to a standard  round of the national championship.  In 2009, the Supersport class for this was renamed AMA Pro Daytona Sportbike Championship. The changes left spectators confused as to why the most powerful motorcycles were replaced by a lesser class in the premier Daytona race. The changes also meant that the top factory backed riders would be excluded from the race.

The race's future was clouded with the circuit's inability to negotiate with the Dorna-aligned Wayne Rainey KRAVE organization that organizes the MotoAmerica motorcycle racing series in the United States beginning in 2015 when MotoAmerica decided not to place Daytona on the 2015 schedule, considerably important since Daytona's 200 mile format was going against the grain of typical 110-km (68 mile) races that are typical of most Superbike races in the world, as MotoAmerica's future plans to adopt the Spanish CEV championship format of FIM Moto3 and Moto2 classes (the Spanish championship is also a Dorna-promoted championship, and most recent riders come from CEV to Moto3), went against the traditions of American motorcycle racing.  On December 1, 2014, American Sportbike Racing Association, parent company of Championship Cup Series (CCS), which sanctions the Fall Cycle Scene autumn events at Daytona, agreed to sanction the Daytona 200 with Supersport motorcycles racing 57 laps on the full motorcycle layout.

Steve Rapp's 2007 victory was the first win for Kawasaki since 1995 and the first win for a privateer rider since John Ashmead won in 1989.

The race was cancelled in 2020 for the first time since World War II because of the COVID-19 pandemic after the Rudy Gobert incident took place during the Wednesday of the race meeting, and officials moved the entire race meeting to Biketoberfest with the Fall Cycle Scene at the Speedway.  When the city cancelled Biketoberfest, the feature was cancelled, but not the remainder of the fall race meeting.

Conducted despite the pandemic, the 2021 race saw a thrilling finish line victory by rising star, American Brandon Paasch. Coming out of the final pit stop six seconds behind race leader Sean Dylan Kelly, Paasch made a thrilling charge to catch the leader, with a daring pass at the line to win by .03 second.

For the 2022 edition, MotoAmerica replaced ASRA as the sanctioning body, with the race becoming a non-points race under updated Supersport rules.

The race has been one of the toughest in American motorcycling because of its endurance-like qualities of pit stops for tires and fuel, and safety car periods, and nine FIM world champions, including seven 500cc/MotoGP World Champions—six Americans and one Italian—have won the race.  Of recent American world champions, only Kenny Roberts Jr. did not win the Daytona 200.  Finnish and Venezuelan FIM world champions in smaller classes have also won the 200.

Scott Russell and Miguel Duhamel are tied for most Daytona 200 wins at five each. Russell, known by the nickname "Mr. Daytona" because of his achievements at the famed track, won all his Daytona races in the Superbike class (750-1000cc).  Duhamel's fifth victory came in the Supersport-based classes beginning in 2005.

Daytona 200 Winners

See also
Daytona Beach Bike Week
Daytona 500, NASCAR's equivalent, but longer
Imola 200, former European equivalent

References

External links

AMA Pro Road Racing event page 
LIFE at Daytona: Motorcycle Madness on the Florida Sands - 1948 slideshow by Life magazine

Motorcycle races in the United States
Motorsport in Daytona Beach, Florida
Recurring sporting events established in 1937
1937 establishments in Florida
Superbike racing
American Motorcyclist Association